Agyneta allosubtilis is a species of sheet weaver found in the Holarctic. It was described by Loksa in 1965.

References

allosubtilis
Holarctic spiders
Spiders described in 1965